The Rapture of the Deep tour was a worldwide concert tour by British hard rock band Deep Purple.

It took place in support of their 2005 studio album Rapture of the Deep. It is supposed to be one of the most successful and long-lasting tours the band has ever done. In 2007, it was voted #6 tour of the year by listeners of the Planet Rock radio station.

Overview
In 2005, Deep Purple released the Rapture of the Deep studio album which enjoyed a modest success, especially in Europe where it charted Top 20 in several countries.

In support of their new studio album, Deep Purple embarked in a world tour during which they covered five continents and played in more than 50 countries. They did over 28 legs in Europe, UK, North America, South America, Asia, Africa and Australia, playing almost 500 shows in six years. Venue sizes varied from big concert halls to the world's largest arenas and stadiums.

During the tour, Deep Purple headlined several of the world's biggest festivals, including:
Monsters of Rock at Milton Keynes Bowl (UK) (40,000 attended),
Montreux Jazz Festival (Switzerland) (80,000 attended),
Fête de l'Humanité (France) (100,000 attended),
Sweden Rock Festival (Sweden) (50,000 attended),
Monsters of Rock (Spain) (30,000 attended),
Cosquin Rock (Argentina) (100,000 attended),
Rock Over The Volga (Russia) (200,000 attended), the biggest crowd in Deep Purple history together with rock music festival California Jam of 1974.

Although some fans called the 2010 leg simply "World Tour" (since at that time only one song from Rapture of the Deep – the title track – remained in the set list), Don Airey, the band's keyboardist, said it's still the Rapture of the Deep tour.

Tour history

2006
The Rapture of the Deep tour kicked off with an intimate sold-out show at London's Astoria hall, and quickly moved on to a sold-out European tour, booked in the continent's biggest arenas.

After two sold-out shows at Argentina's Luna Park Stadium, the band played one festival date in Chile and after a one-month break they moved straight to Australia. The 10 dates on the Australian leg proved to be extremely successful; tickets sold out very quickly and promoters had to add more dates. The band sold over 50,000 tickets for the Australian leg and moved to Japan with 5 concerts.

A second huge European leg followed in summer. Deep Purple kicked it off with the extremely successful gig at Milton Keynes Bowl, in front of over 50,000 people. Besides the single shows, they played many festival dates as headliners, such as Sweden Rock Festival (attendance: 50,000) and Montreux Jazz Festival. The Montreux show was recorded professionally and later released on CD/DVD called They All Came Down to Montreux. The European leg lasted over 6 months and they played Europe's biggest arenas, all sold-out.

On 17 December 2006, Deep Purple played a gig at Cathedral School Grounds, Bangalore, India.

Deep Purple ended the 2006 tour with a successful South American leg, 11 arena + stadium dates.

2007
2007 began with a huge European tour again. After visiting Italy and France, they moved to the full UK arena tour, playing at sold-out Wembley Arena, LG Arena and Windsor Hall, overall 10 dates in the UK. However, singer Ian Gillan announced at a Wembley show that it was the last time they would play at the arena, because of the rudeness of security guards, who beat several fans during the show.

Summer 2007 saw Deep Purple overseas, on a full North American tour. 27 dates in USA and 3 in Canada. In the USA they mostly played at big arenas and amphitheaters, plus several theaters and two sold out dates at the House of Blues of Chicago. After playing at Montreal's Bell Centre in front of 10,000 people, they moved to New York to play in the Radio City Music Hall. The North American leg ended with a sold-out intimate show at Dallas's House of Blues

2007's last leg was Europe again. Deep Purple kicked it off at Bucharest's National Stadium and the tour lasted over one month.

At the end of year Deep Purple received a special award in France, for selling 150,000 concert tickets in the country in one year. Officials said Deep Purple sold more tickets than any music artist has ever done in one year in France.

2008
2008 began with a second full South American leg, with 13 dates in 6 countries. Tickets for the show at Buenos Aires's Luna Park Stadium sold out quickly, prompting promoters to announce a second date at the same stadium.

A European festival tour followed in the summer. The first gig was Monsters of Rock in Spain. Deep Purple was due to headline the festival's first day (the second day to be headlined by Iron Maiden). Unfortunately, a severe rainstorm washed out tens of thousands people and damaged the stage. So, promoters had to cancel the whole festival. After two sold-out shows at Teatro Smeraldo in Milan, Deep Purple headlined Montreux Jazz Festival for the second time on the Rapture Tour. Festival dates also included Deep Purple as a headliner at: "British Motorshow & Music Festival", UK, "Festival de la cite de Carcassonne", "Les Nuits de la Guitare", France "Zweite Classic Rocknacht", "Magic Night of Rock" Germany and "Steinkjer Rock" Norway.

The Israel fall tour proved to be phenomenally successful for the band. Deep Purple's last gig in the country was in 1991, when the band was led by Joe Lynn Turner. This time, led by Ian Gillan promoters announced one show at Caesarea Amphiteatre. The first gig was sold out in three days, so promoters added a second one, which sold-out in one week. That prompted promoters to add a third gig at the same arena, and one at Tel Aviv. Israeli press called Deep Purple's tour a "phenomenal success", and the band sold the most tickets in the country that have ever sold in the same year. After the 4 sold-out shows, the press called it the "event of the year"

The 2008 tour ended with a Russia/Ukraine/Germany Arena tour, in 10,000-15,000 capacity arenas, all sold-out.

2009
2009's first gig saw Deep Purple as a headliner band on the World Ski Championship. After this one-off show they quickly moved to South America. Although Ian Gillan caught a flu and was extremely ill, with the 11 dates in South America Deep Purple sold over 250,000 tickets (including 150 000 tickets at Cosquin Rock festival, 50,000 at Antofagasta's velodrome, 20,000 tickets at two sold-out shows at Luna Park Stadium and 15,000 tickets at two sold-out shows at São Paulo's Via Funchall hall). Ian Gillan released a special video message about his illness, as fans were worried by his vocal conditions caused by the flu.

After headlining the "Dubai Bike Week 2009" in front of some 30,000 people, Deep Purple moved to their second Japanese tour during the Rapture Tour with guitarist Yngwie Malmsteen as a support act.

Spring/summer saw the band at a huge European arena tour again. Deep Purple made a one show at Istanbul's Kurucesme Arena. This was particular show, as 500 fans (out of the 20,000) had travelled from Georgia, Tbilisi and Ian Gillan made a very special meet and greet with Georgian fans. Later in an interview Gillan called it one of the most wonderful days on the tour, as he has very special memories from Georgia, as it the place where he married his wife Bron Gillan, in 1990.

After playing their own festival dates, suddenly Deep Purple were called by the promoter of Rock am See and 1-Day Milano Urban Festival. The festival was supposed to be headlined by Oasis, but they split. So, the promoters had to replace them with another headliner. They choose Deep Purple. According to the bassist Roger Glover, they were not sure what was going to happen, as Oasis plays different kind of music and most of the ticket holders were fans of different music than Deep Purple plays. The promoter later announced that The band saved a festival. 90% of Oasis' fans watched Deep Purple's concert and after the show, they were posting on the forum that they were overwhelmed by the gig. Kasabian's leader was watching the show from backstage and later said that it was the greatest concert he has ever seen.

At the end of the leg Deep Purple played at a notorious French political gig Fête de l'Humanité in Paris, France. The concert was attended by 110,000 people.

In late 2009 the band went on a small UK Tour, visiting several theaters (including two sold-out gigs at the Hammersmith Apollo, + one big show at LG Arena.

20 dates European leg followed and the 2009 tour ended at Bologna. The show was broadcast live on Italian RAI radio1 and was quickly heavily bootlegged.

2010
Deep Purple played 79 dates: Mexico, South East Asia, Australia, South Africa & Europe.

2011

After a 4-date tour in Mexico in February, Deep Purple has planned to play the Commonwealth of Independent States, Eastern Europe & Israel in spring (14 dates). During the Greece leg of the tour Roger Glover announced his absence from the band due a shoulder injury, and was temporarily replaced by the current The Temperance Movement bassist Nick Fyffe for a series of shows during May of that year.

Tour dates

Notable live dates
In June 2006 Deep Purple headlined the Monsters of Rock festival at Milton Keynes Bowl (UK), in front of more than 30,000 people.
Two weeks later the band played at the prestigious Montreux Jazz Festival (40th anniversary). A year after that, this show was released as a Live CD and DVD, called: They All Came Down To Montreux. The Montreux 2006 show included a jam session with Claude Nobs, several jazz/funky artists and a jazz version of Deep Purple's world hit Smoke on the Water.
In 2006, during the North American tour, the band played in Rock Fest Cadott, Wisconsin USA; and also participated in Musikfest Bethlehem, Pennsylvania USA, with John Kay and Steppenwolf.
In July 2008, Deep Purple headlined the Montreux Jazz Festival for the second time during the Rapture of the Deep tour, the band also participated in 3 Rock Festivals in Germany.
Tickets for the band's first Israeli dates in over a decade sold out within a few days and resulted in the addition of two more dates.

During the entire Rapture of the Deep tour, Deep Purple headlined more than 30 world-known music festivals, including headlining the Monsters of Rock and the Montreux Jazz Festival twice each.

Musicians
Deep Purple is nowadays touring and recording as the MK VIII line-up. The band comprises:
Ian Gillan – vocals
Steve Morse – guitars
Roger Glover – bass
Ian Paice – drums
Don Airey – keyboards

In 2011, Roger Glover had to leave the band for a few weeks due to personal reasons. During the shows in Cyprus, Greece, Israel and Turkey the bass parts were played by bassist Nick Fyffe.

Typical set-lists
During the tour, the band played 7 songs from the new album Rapture of the Deep: "Wrong Man", "Rapture of the Deep", "Back to Back", "Kiss Tomorrow Goodbye", "Junkyard Blues", "Before Time Began" and "Things I Never Said". "The Well-Dressed Guitar", which has been release on the "Tour Edition" is an outtake from the Bananas sessions and has been played live since 2001. Severals old songs never played live before were also included in the setlists during the tour, such as "Hard Lovin' Man", "Living Wreck", "Loosen My Strings", "Not Responsible" and "Wasted Sunsets".

{{hidden
| headercss = background: #ccccff; font-size: 100%; width: 55%;
| contentcss = text-align: left; font-size: 100%; width: 55%;
| header = Europe I and South America I 2006
| content = 
 "Pictures of Home" (from Machine Head)
 "Things I Never Said" (from Rapture of the Deep)
 "Wrong Man" (from Rapture of the Deep)
 "Ted the Mechanic" (from Purpendicular)
 "Living Wreck" (from Deep Purple in Rock)
 "Rapture of the Deep" (from Rapture of the Deep)
 "Back to Back" (from Rapture of the Deep) or "Mary Long" (from Who Do We Think We Are) (not on every show, sometimes played after "Before Time Began")
 "Before Time Began" (from Rapture of the Deep)
 "Contact Lost" (from Bananas)
 Steve Morse guitar solo
 "The Well-Dressed Guitar" (from Rapture of the Deep – Tour Edition)
 "Lazy" (from Machine Head)
 Don Airey keyboard solo
 "Perfect Strangers" (from Perfect Strangers)
 "Junkyard Blues" (from Rapture of the Deep) (not on every show)
 "Kiss Tomorrow Goodbye" (from Rapture of the Deep) or "Sometimes I Feel Like Screaming" (from Purpendicular)
 "Space Truckin'" (from Machine Head)
 "Highway Star" (from Machine Head)
 "Smoke on the Water" (from Machine Head)
Encore :
 "Speed King" (from Deep Purple in Rock) or "Hush" (from Shades of Deep Purple) (with Ian Paice drum solo) or "Kiss Tomorrow Goodbye" (from Rapture of the Deep)
 Roger Glover bass solo
 "Black Night" (from Deep Purple in Rock)
}}

{{hidden
| headercss = background: #ccccff; font-size: 100%; width: 55%;
| contentcss = text-align: left; font-size: 100%; width: 55%;
| header = Oceania I 2006
| content = 
 "Pictures of Home" (from Machine Head)
 "Things I Never Said" (from Rapture of the Deep)
 "Wrong Man" (from Rapture of the Deep)
 "Ted the Mechanic" (from Purpendicular)
 "Mary Long" (from Who Do We Think We Are)
 "Rapture of the Deep" (from Rapture of the Deep)
 "Kiss Tomorrow Goodbye" (from Rapture of the Deep)
 "Contact Lost" (from Bananas)
 Steve Morse guitar solo
 "The Well-Dressed Guitar" (from Rapture of the Deep – Tour Edition)
 "Lazy" (from Machine Head)
 Don Airey keyboard solo
 "Perfect Strangers" (from Perfect Strangers)
 "Space Truckin'" (from Machine Head)
 "Highway Star" (from Machine Head)
 "Smoke on the Water" (from Machine Head)
Encore :
 "Hush" (from Shades of Deep Purple) (with Ian Paice drum solo)
 Roger Glover bass solo
 "Black Night" (from Deep Purple in Rock)
}}

{{hidden
| headercss = background: #ccccff; font-size: 100%; width: 55%;
| contentcss = text-align: left; font-size: 100%; width: 55%;
| header = Asia 2006
| content = 
 "Pictures of Home" (from Machine Head)
 "Things I Never Said" (from Rapture of the Deep)
 "Wrong Man" (from Rapture of the Deep)
 "Strange Kind of Woman" (from Fireball)
 "Rapture of the Deep" or "Before Time Began" (from Rapture of the Deep)
 "Fireball" (from Fireball)
 "Contact Lost" (from Bananas)
 Steve Morse guitar solo
 "The Well-Dressed Guitar" (from Rapture of the Deep – Tour Edition)
 "Lazy" (from Machine Head)
 "Sometimes I Feel Like Screaming" (from Purpendicular) (not on every show)
 "Kiss Tomorrow Goodbye" (from Rapture of the Deep)
 Don Airey keyboard solo
 "Perfect Strangers" (from Perfect Strangers)
 "Space Truckin'" (from Machine Head)
 "Highway Star" (from Machine Head)
 "Smoke on the Water" (from Machine Head)
Encore :
 "Hush" (from Shades of Deep Purple) (with Ian Paice drum solo)
 Roger Glover bass solo
 "Black Night" (from Deep Purple in Rock)
}}

{{hidden
| headercss = background: #ccccff; font-size: 100%; width: 55%;
| contentcss = text-align: left; font-size: 100%; width: 55%;
| header = Europe II 2006
| content = 
The setlist changed a lot during this leg of the tour. The following setlist is inspired by the one from the Montreux Jazz Festival. The band also played "Fireball" several times.
 "Pictures of Home" (from Machine Head)
 "Things I Never Said" (from Rapture of the Deep)
 "Strange Kind of Woman" (from Fireball)
 "Rapture of the Deep" (from Rapture of the Deep)
 "Wrong Man" (from Rapture of the Deep)
 "Contact Lost" (from Bananas) (not on every show)
 Steve Morse guitar solo
 "The Well-Dressed Guitar" (from Rapture of the Deep – Tour Edition)
 "Kiss Tomorrow Goodbye" (from Rapture of the Deep)
 "When A Blind Man Cries" (from Machine Head)
 "Lazy" (from Machine Head)
 Don Airey keyboard solo
 "Perfect Strangers" (from Perfect Strangers)
 "Space Truckin'" (from Machine Head)
 "Highway Star" (from Machine Head)
 "Smoke on the Water" (from Machine Head)
Encore :
 "Hush" (from Shades of Deep Purple) (with Ian Paice drum solo)
 "Too Much Fun" (new song) (not on every show)
 Roger Glover bass solo
 "Black Night" (from Deep Purple in Rock)
}}

{{hidden
| headercss = background: #ccccff; font-size: 100%; width: 55%;
| contentcss = text-align: left; font-size: 100%; width: 55%;
| header = Europe III, South America II and India 2006
| content = 
 "Pictures of Home" (from Machine Head)
 "Things I Never Said" (from Rapture of the Deep)
 "Into The Fire" (from Deep Purple in Rock)
 "Strange Kind of Woman" (from Fireball)
 "Rapture of the Deep" (from Rapture of the Deep)
 "Fireball" (from Fireball)
 "Wrong Man" (from Rapture of the Deep)
 Steve Morse guitar solo
 "The Well-Dressed Guitar" (from Rapture of the Deep – Tour Edition)
 "Kiss Tomorrow Goodbye" (from Rapture of the Deep)
 "When A Blind Man Cries" (from Machine Head)
 "Lazy" (from Machine Head)
 Don Airey keyboard solo
 "Perfect Strangers" (from Perfect Strangers)
 "Space Truckin'" (from Machine Head)
 "Highway Star" (from Machine Head)
 "Smoke on the Water" (from Machine Head)
Encore :
 "Hush" (from Shades of Deep Purple) (with Ian Paice drum solo)
 Roger Glover bass solo
 "Black Night" (from Deep Purple in Rock)
}}

{{hidden
| headercss = background: #ccccff; font-size: 100%; width: 55%;
| contentcss = text-align: left; font-size: 100%; width: 55%;
| header = Europe IV 2007
| content = 
 "Pictures of Home" (from Machine Head)
 "Things I Never Said" (from Rapture of the Deep)
 "Into The Fire" (from Deep Purple in Rock)
 "Strange Kind of Woman" (from Fireball)
 "Rapture of the Deep" (from Rapture of the Deep)
 "Fireball" (from Fireball)
 Steve Morse guitar solo
 "The Well-Dressed Guitar" (from Rapture of the Deep – Tour Edition)
 "When A Blind Man Cries" (from Machine Head)
 "Lazy" (from Machine Head)
 "The Battle Rages On" (from The Battle Rages On...)
 Don Airey keyboard solo
 "Perfect Strangers" (from Perfect Strangers)
 "Space Truckin'" (from Machine Head)
 "Highway Star" (from Machine Head)
 "Smoke on the Water" (from Machine Head)
Encore :
 "Hush" (from Shades of Deep Purple) (with Ian Paice drum solo)
 Roger Glover bass solo
 "Black Night" (from Deep Purple in Rock)
}}

{{hidden
| headercss = background: #ccccff; font-size: 100%; width: 55%;
| contentcss = text-align: left; font-size: 100%; width: 55%;
| header = North America 2007
| content = 
 "Pictures of Home" (from Machine Head)
 "Things I Never Said" (from Rapture of the Deep)
 "Into The Fire" (from Deep Purple in Rock)
 "Strange Kind of Woman" (from Fireball)
 "Rapture of the Deep" (from Rapture of the Deep)
 "Fireball" (from Fireball) or "Woman From Tokyo" (from Who Do We Think We Are) or "Kiss Tomorrow Goodbye" (from Rapture of the Deep)
 "Contact Lost" (from Bananas) (not on every show)
 Steve Morse guitar solo
 "The Well-Dressed Guitar" (from Rapture of the Deep – Tour Edition)
 "When A Blind Man Cries" (from Machine Head)
 "Lazy" (from Machine Head)
 "Knocking at Your Back Door" (from Perfect Strangers)
 Don Airey keyboard solo
 "Perfect Strangers" (from Perfect Strangers)
 "Space Truckin'" (from Machine Head)
 "Highway Star" (from Machine Head)
 "Smoke on the Water" (from Machine Head)
Encore :
 "Hush" (from Shades of Deep Purple) (with Ian Paice drum solo)
 Roger Glover bass solo
 "Black Night" (from Deep Purple in Rock)
}}

{{hidden
| headercss = background: #ccccff; font-size: 100%; width: 55%;
| contentcss = text-align: left; font-size: 100%; width: 55%;
| header = Europe V 2007 and Latin America 2008
| content = 
 "Pictures of Home" (from Machine Head)
 "Things I Never Said" (from Rapture of the Deep)
 "Into The Fire" (from Deep Purple in Rock)
 "Strange Kind of Woman" (from Fireball)
 "Rapture of the Deep" (from Rapture of the Deep)
 "Mary Long" or "Woman From Tokyo" (from Who Do We Think We Are)
 "Kiss Tomorrow Goodbye" (from Rapture of the Deep)
 "Contact Lost" (from Bananas)
 Steve Morse guitar solo
 "The Well-Dressed Guitar" (from Rapture of the Deep – Tour Edition)
 "The Battle Rages On" (from The Battle Rages On...) or "Knocking at Your Back Door" (from Perfect Strangers)
 "Lazy" (from Machine Head)
 "Loosen My Strings" (from Purpendicular) (only Europe 2007, not on every show)
 Don Airey keyboard solo
 "Perfect Strangers" (from Perfect Strangers)
 "Space Truckin'" (from Machine Head)
 "Highway Star" (from Machine Head)
 "Smoke on the Water" (from Machine Head)
Encore :
 "Speed King" (from Deep Purple in Rock) (only in Varese, Italy)
 "Hush" (from Shades of Deep Purple) (with Ian Paice drum solo)
 Roger Glover bass solo
 "Black Night" (from Deep Purple in Rock)
}}

{{hidden
| headercss = background: #ccccff; font-size: 100%; width: 55%;
| contentcss = text-align: left; font-size: 100%; width: 55%;
| header = Europe VI 2008
| content = 
 "Fireball" (from Fireball)
 "Into The Fire" (from Deep Purple in Rock)
 "Strange Kind of Woman" (from Fireball)
 "Rapture of the Deep" (from Rapture of the Deep)
 "Mary Long" (from Who Do We Think We Are)
 "Kiss Tomorrow Goodbye" (from Rapture of the Deep)
 "Contact Lost" (from Bananas)
 Steve Morse guitar solo
 "Sometimes I Feel Like Screaming" (from Purpendicular)
 "Wring That Neck" (from The Book of Taliesyn)
 "The Well-Dressed Guitar" (from Rapture of the Deep – Tour Edition)
 "The Battle Rages On" (from The Battle Rages On...)
 "Demon's Eye" (from Fireball) (not on every show)
 Don Airey keyboard solo
 "Perfect Strangers" (from Perfect Strangers)
 "Space Truckin'" (from Machine Head)
 "Highway Star" (from Machine Head)
 "Smoke on the Water" (from Machine Head)
Encore :
 "Speed King" (from Deep Purple in Rock) (not on every show)
 "Hush" (from Shades of Deep Purple) (with Ian Paice drum solo)
 Roger Glover bass solo
 "Black Night" (from Deep Purple in Rock)
}}

{{hidden
| headercss = background: #ccccff; font-size: 100%; width: 55%;
| contentcss = text-align: left; font-size: 100%; width: 55%;
| header = Middle East 2008
| content = 
 "Pictures of Home" (from Machine Head)
 "Things I Never Said" (from Rapture of the Deep)
 "Into The Fire" (from Deep Purple in Rock)
 "Strange Kind of Woman" (from Fireball)
 "Rapture of the Deep" (from Rapture of the Deep)
 "Contact Lost" (from Bananas)
 Steve Morse guitar solo
 "The Well-Dressed Guitar" (from Rapture of the Deep – Tour Edition)
 "Sometimes I Feel Like Screaming" (from Purpendicular) or "When A Blind Man Cries" (from Machine Head)
 "Wring That Neck" (from The Book of Taliesyn) or "Fireball" (from Fireball)
 "The Battle Rages On" (from The Battle Rages On...) or "Lazy" (from Machine Head)
 Don Airey keyboard solo
 "Perfect Strangers" (from Perfect Strangers)
 "Space Truckin'" (from Machine Head)
 "Highway Star" (from Machine Head)
 "Smoke on the Water" (from Machine Head)
Encore :
 "Hush" (from Shades of Deep Purple) (with Ian Paice drum solo)
 Roger Glover bass solo
 "Black Night" (from Deep Purple in Rock)
}}

{{hidden
| headercss = background: #ccccff; font-size: 100%; width: 55%;
| contentcss = text-align: left; font-size: 100%; width: 55%;
| header = Europe VII 2008
| content = 
 "Pictures of Home" (from Machine Head)
 "Things I Never Said" (from Rapture of the Deep)
 "Into The Fire" (from Deep Purple in Rock)
 "Strange Kind of Woman" (from Fireball)
 "Rapture of the Deep" (from Rapture of the Deep)
 "Contact Lost" (from Bananas)
 Steve Morse guitar solo
 "The Well-Dressed Guitar" (from Rapture of the Deep – Tour Edition)
 "Mary Long" (from Who Do We Think We Are) or "Knocking at Your Back Door" (from Perfect Strangers)
 "Sometimes I Feel Like Screaming" (from Purpendicular)
 "Wring That Neck" (from The Book of Taliesyn)
 "The Battle Rages On" (from The Battle Rages On...)
 Don Airey keyboard solo
 "Perfect Strangers" (from Perfect Strangers)
 "Space Truckin'" (from Machine Head)
 "Highway Star" (from Machine Head)
 "Smoke on the Water" (from Machine Head)
Encore :
 "Hush" (from Shades of Deep Purple) (with Ian Paice drum solo)
 Roger Glover bass solo
 "Black Night" (from Deep Purple in Rock)
}}

{{hidden
| headercss = background: #ccccff; font-size: 100%; width: 55%;
| contentcss = text-align: left; font-size: 100%; width: 55%;
| header = South America III and Japan 2009
| content = 
 "Highway Star" (from Machine Head)
 "Things I Never Said" (from Rapture of the Deep)
 "Into The Fire" (from Deep Purple in Rock)
 "Strange Kind of Woman" (from Fireball)
 "Mary Long" (from Who Do We Think We Are) (played after "Rapture of the Deep" in Japan)
 "Rapture of the Deep" (from Rapture of the Deep)
 "Contact Lost" (from Bananas)
 Steve Morse guitar solo
 "The Well-Dressed Guitar" (from Rapture of the Deep – Tour Edition) (played after "Sometimes I Feel Like Screaming" in Japan)
 "Sometimes I Feel Like Screaming" (from Purpendicular)
 "Wring That Neck" (from The Book of Taliesyn)
 "The Battle Rages On" (from The Battle Rages On...)
 Don Airey keyboard solo
 "Perfect Strangers" (from Perfect Strangers)
 "Space Truckin'" (from Machine Head)
 "Smoke on the Water" (from Machine Head)
Encore :
 "Hush" (from Shades of Deep Purple) (with Ian Paice drum solo)
 Roger Glover bass solo
 "Black Night" (from Deep Purple in Rock)
}}

{{hidden
| headercss = background: #ccccff; font-size: 100%; width: 55%;
| contentcss = text-align: left; font-size: 100%; width: 55%;
| header = Europe VIII 2009
| content = 
 "Highway Star" (from Machine Head)
 "Things I Never Said" (from Rapture of the Deep)
 "Wrong Man"  (from Rapture of the Deep) or "Not Responsible" (from Perfect Strangers) or "Maybe I'm A Leo" (from Machine Head) or "Bloodsucker" (from Deep Purple in Rock)
 "Strange Kind of Woman" (from Fireball)
 "Wasted Sunsets" (from Perfect Strangers) (not on every show)
 "Rapture of the Deep" (from Rapture of the Deep)
 "Fireball" (from Fireball)
 "Contact Lost" (from Bananas)
 Steve Morse guitar solo
 "Sometimes I Feel Like Screaming" (from Purpendicular)
 "The Well-Dressed Guitar" (from Rapture of the Deep – Tour Edition)
 "Knocking at Your Back Door" (from Perfect Strangers) or "Pictures of Home" (from Machine Head) (not on every show)
 "Wring That Neck" (from The Book of Taliesyn) or "Lazy" (from Machine Head)
 "The Battle Rages On" (from The Battle Rages On...) or "No One Came" (from Fireball)
 Don Airey keyboard solo
 "Perfect Strangers" (from Perfect Strangers) or "The Battle Rages On" (from The Battle Rages On...)
 "Space Truckin'" (from Machine Head)
 "Smoke on the Water" (from Machine Head)
Encore :
 "Hush" (from Shades of Deep Purple) (with Ian Paice drum solo)
 Roger Glover bass solo
 "Black Night" (from Deep Purple in Rock)
}}

{{hidden
| headercss = background: #ccccff; font-size: 100%; width: 55%;
| contentcss = text-align: left; font-size: 100%; width: 55%;
| header = Oceania II and South Africa 2010
| content = 
 "Highway Star" (from Machine Head)
 "Things I Never Said" (from Rapture of the Deep)
 "Strange Kind of Woman" (from Fireball)
 "Wasted Sunsets" (from Perfect Strangers) or "Maybe I'm A Leo" (from Machine Head)
 "Rapture of the Deep" (from Rapture of the Deep)
 "Fireball" (from Fireball)
 "Contact Lost" (from Bananas)
 Steve Morse guitar solo
 "Sometimes I Feel Like Screaming" (from Purpendicular)
 "The Well-Dressed Guitar" (from Rapture of the Deep – Tour Edition)
 "Mary Long" (from Who Do We Think We Are) or "Wrong Man"  (from Rapture of the Deep)
 "Lazy" (from Machine Head)
 "No One Came" (from Fireball)
 Don Airey keyboard solo
 "The Battle Rages On" (from The Battle Rages On...)
 "Space Truckin'" (from Machine Head)
 "Smoke on the Water" (from Machine Head)
Encore :
 "Hush" (from Shades of Deep Purple) (with Ian Paice drum solo)
 Roger Glover bass solo
 "Black Night" (from Deep Purple in Rock)
}}

{{hidden
| headercss = background: #ccccff; font-size: 100%; width: 55%;
| contentcss = text-align: left; font-size: 100%; width: 55%;
| header = Europe IX 2010
| content = 
 "Hard Lovin' Man" (from Deep Purple in Rock)
 "Things I Never Said" (from Rapture of the Deep)
or
 "Highway Star" (from Machine Head)
 "Hard Lovin' Man" (from Deep Purple in Rock)
 "Maybe I'm A Leo" (from Machine Head)
 "Strange Kind of Woman" (from Fireball)
 "Rapture of the Deep" (from Rapture of the Deep)
 "Fireball" (from Fireball)
 "Silver Tongue" (from Bananas)
 "Contact Lost" (from Bananas)
 Steve Morse guitar solo
 "When A Blind Man Cries" (from Machine Head)
 "The Well-Dressed Guitar" (from Rapture of the Deep – Tour Edition)
 "Almost Human" (from Abandon)
 "Lazy" (from Machine Head)
 "No One Came" (from Fireball)
 Don Airey keyboard solo
 "Perfect Strangers" (from Perfect Strangers)
 "Space Truckin'" (from Machine Head)
 "Smoke on the Water" (from Machine Head)
Encore :
 "Hush" (from Shades of Deep Purple) (with Ian Paice drum solo)
 Roger Glover bass solo
 "Black Night" (from Deep Purple in Rock)
}}

Opening acts

The Answer (London Astoria, 17 January 2006)
Thin Lizzy and Styx (British tour April/May 2007)
Edgar Winter (North American tour)
Steppenwolf (North American tour)
Blue Öyster Cult (North American tour)
Hamadryad (Montreal City, 28 July 2007)
Alice Cooper (German tour dates)
Krypteria (German tour dates)
La Carga (Argentina, 24 March 2006)
Yngwie Malmsteen Japan tour dates April 2009
Galeej Gurus (Bangalore. December 2006)
Status Quo (Australian tour)
Uriah Heep (Iceland, German tour dates, South Africa 2010)
Stella Maris (Israel Caesarea Amphitheatre tour dates)
Peter Ron (Chile, 28 February 2008)
Europe (Sweden, 14–15 July 2009)
D-A-D (Gothenburg, 15 July 2009)
The Milestones (Finland, 17 & 18 July 2008)
SBB (Katowice, Poland, 24 February 2006, and Warsaw, Poland, 9 October 2006)
The Crave – UK tour, November 2009
Electric Mary – Australian tour dates, April/May 2010
Marillion – German tour dates, November 2010
Philip Sayce or Puggy – France tour dates, December 2010

References

External links
 Tour dates
 Concert Reviews
 Live At Budapest 6.XI.07 Review in Romanian Language
 Deep Purple Tour Page

2006 concert tours
2007 concert tours
2008 concert tours
2009 concert tours
2010 concert tours
2011 concert tours
Deep Purple concert tours